He Qia (died after 228), courtesy name Yangshi, was a Chinese politician of the state of Cao Wei during the Three Kingdoms period of China. He was known for his austere lifestyle.

Early life
He Qia was born in Xiping County, Runan Commandery, Yu Province, which is present-day Xiping County, Henan. In the 190s, the warlord Yuan Shao sent ambassadors to Runan Commandery inviting the gentry and nobility to join his cause. Yu Province was an area of contention between Yuan Shao and his half-brother Yuan Shu, so He Qia feared staying, but he did not want to serve under a man such as Yuan Shao, whose ambition He Qia felt exceeded his capability.

Instead, He Qia brought his family south to Jing Province to serve the provincial governor Liu Biao, whom He Qia considered to be a kind lord without higher ambition. Crossing the Yangtze river, he settled in at Wuling Commandery in present-day Changde, Hunan.

Service under Cao Cao
In the late 190s, Cao Cao gained control over parts of Jing Province, and He Qia found employment in his administration. In this early stage of his career, he spoke out against the elevation of officers based on their following an ascetic, deliberately impoverished lifestyle, and against seeing these men as more pure than officers who displayed their salary outwardly.

In 213, after Emperor Xian enfeoffed Cao Cao as the Duke of Wei, He Qia served as a Palace Attendant in Cao Cao's dukedom. He unsuccessfully defended Mao Jie against rumours that Mao slandered Cao Cao. Correspondence on the matter between He Qia and Cao Cao has survived until the present-day and has been preserved in the Records of the Three Kingdoms. Due to these rumours, Mao Jie was forced to commit suicide in 216.

Later career
He Qia received successive promotions under Cao Cao and Cao Pi, rising to the position of Minister of the Household, the most important personnel manager of the Wei court. Under Cao Rui, he was granted 200 taxable households in his marquisate as the Marquis of Xiling District.

Late in life, He Qia reversed his position on asceticism and began living a greatly curtailed lifestyle. After he was promoted to the prestigious position of Minister of Ceremonies under Cao Rui, he gave so freely of his salary that he was forced to liquidate his real estate in order to support himself. Cao Rui granted him grain and silk so He Qia could avoid total insolvency. His modest lifestyle is reflected in his posthumous name, Marquis Jian (簡侯; literally "modest marquis").

Family
He Li, He Qia's elder son and successor 
He You, He Qia's younger son, served as Minister of Justice and Secretary of Personnel in Wei
He Qiao (和嶠; died 292), He You's son, served as Junior Protector of the Crown Prince for Sima Yu of the Eastern Jin dynasty; son-in-law of Xiahou Xuan
He Yu, He You's son, served as Prefect of the Masters of Writing under the Eastern Jin dynasty
He Ji, He Yu's son, served as a Palace Writer Attendant under the Eastern Jin dynasty

See also
 Lists of people of the Three Kingdoms

References

 Chen Shou (280s or 290s). Records of the Three Kingdoms (Sanguozhi).
 Fang Xuanling (648). Book of Jin (Jin Shu).
 Pei Songzhi (429). Annotations to Records of the Three Kingdoms (Sanguozhi zhu).

2nd-century births
3rd-century deaths
Cao Wei politicians
Han dynasty politicians from Henan
Liu Biao and associates
Officials under Cao Cao
Politicians from Zhumadian